The 2018 J1 League, also known as the  for sponsorship reasons, was the 26th season of J1 League, the top Japanese professional league for association football clubs, since its establishment in 1993.

Kawasaki Frontale were the defending champions.

2018 season clubs
A total of 18 clubs contested the league. The 2017 J2 League champion Shonan Bellmare and the winner of the promotion play-offs Nagoya Grampus returned to the top flight a year after being relegated from J1 in the 2016 season. V-Varen Nagasaki, J2 runner-up in 2017, played in the J1 League for the first time.

Personnel and kits

Managerial changes

Foreign players
The total number of foreign players is restricted to five per club. Clubs can register up to four foreign players for a single match-day squad, of which a maximum of three are allowed from nations outside the Asian Football Confederation (AFC). Players from J.League partner nations (Thailand, Vietnam, Myanmar, Cambodia, Singapore, Indonesia, Malaysia, Iran and Qatar) are exempt from these restrictions.

Players name in bold indicates the player is registered during the mid-season transfer window.

Results

League table

Positions by round

Results table

Promotion–Relegation Playoff
2018 J.League J1/J2 Play-Offs (2018 J1参入プレーオフ)

Júbilo Iwata remains in J1 League.Tokyo Verdy remains in J2 League.

Season statistics

Top scorers
.

Top assists

Hat-tricks

Note
(H) – Home ; (A) – Away

Attendances

Awards

References

J1 League seasons
1
Japan